The Prosecutor General of Russia (also Attorney General of Russia) heads the system of official prosecution in courts and heads the Office of the Prosecutor General of the Russian Federation. The Prosecutor General remains one of the most powerful component of the Russian judicial system.

Mission
The Office of the Prosecutor General is entrusted with:
 prosecution in court on behalf of the State;
 representation of the interests of a citizen or of the State in court in cases determined by law;
 supervision of the observance of laws by bodies that conduct detective and search activity, inquiry and pretrial investigation;
 supervision of the observance of laws in the execution of judicial decisions in criminal cases, and also in the application of other measures of coercion related to the restraint of personal liberty of citizens.

The Prosecutor General leads the General Prosecutor's Office of Russian Federation. The prosecutor's offices of subjects of Russian Federation are subordinate to the General Prosecutor's Office of Russian Federation, and the prosecutor's offices of cities and raions are subordinate to the prosecutor's offices of subjects of Russian Federation. There are specialized prosecutor's offices (environmental prosecutor's offices, penitentiary prosecutor's offices, transport prosecutor's offices, closed cities prosecutor's offices) which are subordinate to the General Prosecutor's Office of Russian Federation and have own subordinated prosecutor's offices. Finally, there is the Chief Military Prosecutor's Office of Russian Federation which is subordinated to the General Prosecutor's Office of Russian Federation and have own subordinated military prosecutor's offices (military prosecutor's office of Western Military District, military prosecutor's office of Eastern Military District, military prosecutor's office of Southern Military District, military prosecutor's office of Central Military District, military prosecutor's office of Northern Fleet, military prosecutor's office of Baltic Fleet, military prosecutor's office of Black Sea Fleet, military prosecutor's office of Pacific Fleet, military prosecutor's office of Strategic Missile Forces and Moscow city military prosecutor's office) which in turn have own subordinated military prosecutor's offices (garrison military prosecutor's offices).

Prosecutors in a broad sense are directly prosecutors (who leads prosecutor's offices), their deputies, senior assistants and junior assistants. All of them are federal government officials, have special ranks and wear special uniform with shoulder marks. Military prosecutors (in a broad sense) are military personnel, have military ranks of commissioned officers and wear military uniform with shoulder marks but they are not subordinate to any military authority (excepting higher military prosecutor).

Appointment
The Prosecutor General is nominated to the office by the President of Russia and appointed by the majority of Federation Council of Russia (the Upper House of the Russian Parliament). If the nomination falls the President must nominate another candidate within 30 days (article 12 of the Federal Law about the Office of the Prosecutor General of Russian Federation). The term of authority of the Prosecutor General is five years. The resignation of the Prosecutor General before the end of his term should be approved by both the majority of Federation Council of Russia and the President.

Constitutional independence
The Prosecutor General and his office are independent from the Executive, Legislative and Judicial branches of government. The Investigative Committee of Russia, sometimes described as the "Russian FBI", is the main federal investigating authority in Russia, formed in place of the Investigative Committee of the Prosecutor General in 2011.

List of prosecutors general

See also

 Prosecutor General of the USSR
 Ministry of Justice of the USSR
 List of Justice Ministers of Imperial Russia
 List of Prosecutors General of Russia
 Federal Penitentiary Service
 Crime in Russia
Prosecution Service of Russia class rate insignia

References

External links
Site of The Office of the Prosecutor General
List of Prosecutors Generals of Imperial Russia, Soviet Union and Russian Federation

Government of Russia
Law enforcement in Russia
Law of Russia
Prosecution